Daniel Hacker (born January 14, 1982) is an American former professional ice hockey center who last played for the Schwenninger Wild Wings in the Deutsche Eishockey Liga.  He previously played in the ECHL for the Idaho Steelheads, in the American Hockey League for the Iowa Stars, and in the Finnish SM-liiga for SaiPa, Ilves and HIFK. He initially joined the Schwenninger Wild Wings when they were competing in the German 2nd Bundesliga. On May 20, 2015, Hacker announced his retirement from professional hockey after 10 seasons.

References

External links

1982 births
People from El Centro, California
American men's ice hockey centers
HIFK (ice hockey) players
Idaho Steelheads (ECHL) players
Ilves players
Iowa Stars players
Living people
Omaha Mavericks men's ice hockey players
Omaha Lancers players
SaiPa players
Schwenninger Wild Wings players
Ice hockey players from California
People from Wasilla, Alaska
Ice hockey players from Alaska